Rugongwe is an administrative ward within Muhambwe Constituency in Kibondo District of Kigoma Region in Tanzania. In 2016 the Tanzania National Bureau of Statistics report there were 29,990 people in the ward, from 27,246 in 2012.

Villages / neighborhoods 
The ward has 5 villages and 48 hamlets.

 Kichananga
 Kumekucha
 Maendeleo
 Mkogabo
 Mlimani
 Mnazi mmoja
 Mrema
 Nyakichacha
 Nyashimba
 Nyerenda
 Magarama
 Iogoza
 Kahobe
 Kisanda
 Mahaha
 Mnyankoni
 Msamahe
 Nyabwai
 Nyamiheno
 Rubumba
 Sozafyisi
 Kigaga
 Kayogolo
 Kigaga A
 Kigaga B
 Kinani
 Maga
 Mpome
 Nyeseke
 Ruzunzangoma
 Sakunyange
 Kigina
 Bambaziba
 Ingele
 Karole
 Kigina
 Kishindwi
 Malimbi
 Mlinyi
 Mshenyi
 Rubumba
 Rusunwe
 Kisogwe
 Kumnazi
 Kumwelulo A
 Kumwelulo B
 Nyabwa A
 Nyabwa B
 Nyambilembi B
 Nyambilembi C
 Nyamilembi A
 Nyesato
 Rubura

References

Kibondo District
Wards of Kigoma Region
Constituencies of Tanzania